Roychester is an unincorporated community within Abington Township in Montgomery County, Pennsylvania, United States.

Roychester Park
The community is home to a park that shares its name. At the center of The Park is Roychester Community House, which is home to many local clubs and organizations. The facility is also used as a polling place.

Overlook Elementary School
Overlook Elementary School is located in the Roychester section of Abington Township. Overlook is part of Abington School District  and it teaches students from kindergarten through 6th grade. Their mascot is Oliver Owl.

References

Unincorporated communities in Montgomery County, Pennsylvania
Unincorporated communities in Pennsylvania